Leidangen was an organisation for volunteer military education in Norway. The organisation was started in 1931, and had its background in various 1920s volunteer organisations such as the Society Guard. Leidangen differed from the former, in that Leidangen was integrated fully into Norway's military planning. Its name was derived from the medieval levy Leidang. Leidangen received public support from 1933, including loan of weaponry, and was subordinated to a committee that was in part appointed by the state. The organisation was dissolved in 1936.

References

Organizations established in 1931
Organizations disestablished in 1936
Defunct organisations based in Norway
Defunct paramilitary organizations
Paramilitary organisations based in Norway
Military volunteering